Leptostylus lilliputanus is a species of beetle in the family Cerambycidae. It was described by Thompson in 1865.

References

Leptostylus
Beetles described in 1865